Chard is  a leaf vegetable.

Chard may also refer to:
 Chardonnay or Chard, a grape variety or a varietal wine made from the Chardonnay grape
 Chard (name)
 Chard, Alberta an alternative name for a hamlet of Janvier South, in Canada
 Chard, Creuse, a commune of Creuse, France
 Chard, Somerset, a town in England
 Chard RFC, an English rugby union team
 South Chard and Chard Junction, nearby hamlets

See also

Charo (disambiguation)